Knockando distillery is a single malt Scotch whisky distillery, located in Knockando, Moray, in the Strathspey whisky-producing area of Scotland.

Knockando Distillery was built by John Tytler Thomson in 1898, and is named after the village in which it stands. The name derives from Scottish Gaelic Cnoc Cheannachd, meaning "Hill of Commerce". The village is home to a few other small houses and the larger Knockando House, and is surrounded by woods in which there are buzzards, Red Squirrel and Roe Deer. In 1904 the distillery was purchased by W & A Gilbey, a gin producer from London, becoming part of J&B  / Grand Metropolitan in the 1960s and 1970s, and is now owned by multinational firm Diageo.

Knockando was the first distillery in Scotland to be built with electric lighting. In 1905 it was linked directly to the Great North of Scotland Railway, which connected Grantown-on-Spey with the main towns of north-east Scotland. Cottages for distillery workers were built nearby, as well as a house for the Customs and Excise Officer. The distillery currently lies near the disused Dalbeallie Station, which is closer to the Tamdhu distillery. The railway has long since been dismantled, and now forms part of the Speyside Way long-distance walk. The old station has been renamed Tamdhu station, as the buildings are used by the distillery for meetings. Tamdhu was never named station the original line.

Knockando Distillery is home to a famous selection of casks which went into the J & B Ultima blend in 1994 to celebrate the quincentenary of Scotch whisky. This blend contained 128 different whiskies (116 Malt & 12 Grain) and 1 of each of these casks is still maturing in the Warehouse.

References

External links
Listing at whisky.com

Distilleries in Scotland
Scottish malt whisky
Diageo brands